Jordan Gill is an English professional boxer who held the Commonwealth featherweight title in 2018.

Professional career
Gill made his professional debut on 7 July 2012, scoring a four-round points decision (PTS) victory against Kristian Laight at the Sheffield Arena.

After compiling a record of 21–0 (5 KOs), he challenged Commonwealth featherweight champion, Ryan Doyle, on 27 October 2018 at the Copper Box Arena in London. Gill dropped the champion to the canvas in the seventh round with body shots. Doyle was able to beat the referee's count of ten, only to be met with a barrage of punches, prompting referee Victor Laughlin to call a halt to the contest, awarding Gill a seventh-round technical knockout (TKO) victory to become the new Commonwealth champion.

After Gill vacated his Commonwealth title in early 2019, he faced Emmanuel Dominguez for the vacant WBA International featherweight title on 2 March 2019 at the East of England Arena in Peterborough. In an early night for Gill, he dropped his opponent twice in the third round in quick succession before forcing the referee to halt the contest after trapping Dominguez against the ropes while unloading a flurry of punches, awarding Gill the win via third-round TKO to capture the regional WBA title. The first defence of his title came two months later against Mario Enrique Tinoco on 10 May at the Motorpoint Arena in Nottingham. Gill was dropped on three occasions; once in the third round, again in the fifth and once more in the seventh, all by punches to the body. Before the start of round eight, Dave Coldwell, Gill's head trainer, pulled the champion out of the contest to save his charge from further punishment. Tinoco was declared the winner via eighth round corner retirement (RTD). After the fight, Gill claimed his poor performance was due to illness, saying, "I'm not going to make excuses but I'm going to, I've been on the toilet all afternoon. I think I've got food poisoning, I was not going to pull out on the day, I didn't want to quit in the fight."

Gill was booked to face Yesner Talavera on 19 September 2019, at the Tuscany Hall in Florence, Italy. He won his first fight outside of the United Kingdom by unanimous decision, with all three judges scoring the fight 60–54 in his favor. Gill was next scheduled to face Reece Bellotti on 1 August 2020. He won the fight by unanimous decision, with two judges scoring the fight 97–93 for him, while the third judge scored it 96–95 for Gill.

After successfully bouncing back from his first professional loss, Gill faced Cesar Juarez on 20 February 2021, for the vacant WBA International featherweight title. He won the fight by unanimous decision, with scores of 98–92, 98–93 and 96–94. Gill was expected to face Karim Guerfi for the European featherweight title on 11 December 2021. Guerfi later withdrew from the bout due to illness, and was replaced by Alan Castillo, who faced Gill in a non-title bout. The fight was ruled a draw by technical decision, after three rounds. The fight was stopped on the advice of the ringside physician, after Gill suffered a large cut on the hairline, due to an accidental clash of heads.

Professional boxing record

References

Living people
Date of birth missing (living people)
Year of birth missing (living people)
English male boxers
Sportspeople from Cambridgeshire
Featherweight boxers
Super-featherweight boxers
Lightweight boxers
Commonwealth Boxing Council champions